Commutative algebra, first known as ideal theory, is the branch of algebra that studies commutative rings, their ideals, and modules over such rings. Both algebraic geometry and algebraic number theory build on commutative algebra. Prominent examples of commutative rings include polynomial rings; rings of algebraic integers, including the ordinary integers ; and p-adic integers.

Commutative algebra is the main technical tool in the local study of schemes.

The study of rings that are not necessarily commutative is known as noncommutative algebra; it includes ring theory, representation theory, and the theory of Banach algebras.

Overview
Commutative algebra is essentially the study of the rings occurring in algebraic number theory and algebraic geometry.

In algebraic number theory, the rings of algebraic integers are Dedekind rings, which constitute therefore an important class of commutative rings. Considerations related to modular arithmetic have led to the notion of a valuation ring. The restriction of algebraic field extensions to subrings has led to the notions of integral extensions and integrally closed domains as well as the notion of ramification of an extension of valuation rings.

The notion of localization of a ring (in particular the localization with respect to a prime ideal, the localization consisting in inverting a single element and the total quotient ring) is one of the main differences between commutative algebra and the theory of non-commutative rings. It leads to an important class of commutative rings, the local rings that have only one maximal ideal. The set of the prime ideals of a commutative ring is naturally equipped with a topology, the Zariski topology. All these notions are widely used in algebraic geometry and are the basic technical tools for the definition of scheme theory, a generalization of algebraic geometry introduced by Grothendieck.

Many other notions of commutative algebra are counterparts of geometrical notions occurring in algebraic geometry. This is the case of Krull dimension, primary decomposition, regular rings, Cohen–Macaulay rings, Gorenstein rings and many other notions.

History 
The subject, first known as ideal theory, began with Richard Dedekind's work on ideals, itself based on the earlier work of Ernst Kummer and Leopold Kronecker. Later, David Hilbert introduced the term ring to generalize the earlier term number ring. Hilbert introduced a more abstract approach to replace the more concrete and computationally oriented methods grounded in such things as complex analysis and classical invariant theory.  In turn, Hilbert strongly influenced Emmy Noether, who recast many earlier results in terms of an ascending chain condition, now known as the Noetherian condition. Another important milestone was the work of Hilbert's student Emanuel Lasker, who introduced primary ideals and proved the first version of the Lasker–Noether theorem.

The main figure responsible for the birth of commutative algebra as a mature subject was Wolfgang Krull, who introduced the fundamental notions of localization and completion of a ring, as well as that of regular local rings. He established the concept of the Krull dimension of a ring, first for Noetherian rings before moving on to expand his theory to cover general valuation rings and Krull rings. To this day, Krull's principal ideal theorem is widely considered the single most important foundational theorem in commutative algebra. These results paved the way for the introduction of commutative algebra into algebraic geometry, an idea which would revolutionize the latter subject.

Much of the modern development of commutative algebra emphasizes modules.  Both  ideals of a ring R and R-algebras are special cases of R-modules, so module theory encompasses both ideal theory and the theory of ring extensions.  Though it was already incipient in Kronecker's work, the modern approach to commutative algebra using module theory is usually credited to Krull and Noether.

Main tools and results

Noetherian rings

In mathematics, more specifically in the area of modern algebra known as ring theory, a Noetherian ring, named after Emmy Noether, is a ring in which every non-empty set of ideals has a maximal element. Equivalently, a ring is Noetherian if it satisfies the ascending chain condition on ideals; that is, given any chain:

there exists an n such that:

For a commutative ring to be Noetherian it suffices that every prime ideal of the ring is finitely generated. (The result is due to I. S. Cohen.)

The notion of a Noetherian ring is of fundamental importance in both commutative and noncommutative ring theory, due to the role it plays in simplifying the ideal structure of a ring. For instance, the ring of integers and the polynomial ring over a field are both Noetherian rings, and consequently, such theorems as the Lasker–Noether theorem, the Krull intersection theorem, and the Hilbert's basis theorem hold for them. Furthermore, if a ring is Noetherian, then it satisfies the descending chain condition on prime ideals. This property suggests a deep theory of dimension for Noetherian rings beginning with the notion of the Krull dimension.

Hilbert's basis theorem

Hilbert's basis theorem has some immediate corollaries:

By induction we see that  will also be Noetherian. 
If  is a finitely-generated -algebra, then we know that , where  is an ideal. The basis theorem implies that  must be finitely generated, say , i.e.  is finitely presented.

Primary decomposition

An ideal Q of a ring is said to be primary if Q is proper and whenever xy ∈ Q, either x ∈ Q or yn ∈ Q for some positive integer n. In Z, the primary ideals are precisely the ideals of the form (pe) where p is prime and e is a positive integer. Thus, a primary decomposition of (n) corresponds to representing (n) as the intersection of finitely many primary ideals.

The Lasker–Noether theorem, given here, may be seen as a certain generalization of the fundamental theorem of arithmetic:

For any primary decomposition of I, the set of all radicals, that is, the set {Rad(Q1), ..., Rad(Qt)} remains the same by the Lasker–Noether theorem. In fact, it turns out that (for a Noetherian ring) the set is precisely the assassinator of the module R/I; that is, the set of all annihilators of R/I (viewed as a module over R) that are prime.

Localization

The localization is a formal way to introduce the "denominators" to a given ring or a module. That is, it introduces a new ring/module out of an existing one so that it consists of fractions 
.
where the denominators s range in a given subset S of R. The archetypal example is the construction of the ring Q of rational numbers from the ring Z of integers.

Completion

A completion is any of several related functors on rings and modules that result in complete topological rings and modules. Completion is similar  to localization, and together they are among the most basic tools in analysing commutative rings. Complete commutative rings have simpler structure than the general ones and Hensel's lemma applies to them.

Zariski topology on prime ideals

The Zariski topology defines a topology on the spectrum of a ring (the set of prime ideals).  In this formulation, the Zariski-closed sets are taken to be the sets

where A is a fixed commutative ring and I is an ideal.  This is defined in analogy with the classical Zariski topology, where closed sets in affine space are those defined by polynomial equations . To see the connection with the classical picture, note that for any set S of polynomials (over an algebraically closed field), it follows from Hilbert's Nullstellensatz that the points of V(S) (in the old sense) are exactly the tuples (a1, ..., an) such that (x1 - a1, ..., xn - an) contains S; moreover, these are maximal ideals and by the "weak" Nullstellensatz, an ideal of any affine coordinate ring is maximal if and only if it is of this form.  Thus, V(S) is "the same as" the maximal ideals containing S.  Grothendieck's innovation in defining Spec was to replace maximal ideals with all prime ideals; in this formulation it is natural to simply generalize this observation to the definition of a closed set in the spectrum of a ring.

Examples

The fundamental example in commutative algebra is the ring of integers . The existence of primes and 
the unique factorization theorem laid the foundations for concepts such as Noetherian rings and the primary decomposition.

Other important examples are:
Polynomial rings 
The p-adic integers
Rings of algebraic integers.

Connections with algebraic geometry
Commutative algebra (in the form of polynomial rings and their quotients, used in the definition of algebraic varieties) has always been a part of algebraic geometry. However, in the late 1950s, algebraic varieties were subsumed into Alexander Grothendieck's concept of a scheme. Their local objects are affine schemes or prime spectra, which are locally ringed spaces, which form a category that is antiequivalent (dual) to the category of commutative unital rings, extending the duality between the category of affine algebraic varieties over a field k, and the category of finitely generated reduced k-algebras. The gluing is along the Zariski topology; one can glue within the category of locally ringed spaces, but also, using the Yoneda embedding, within the more abstract category of presheaves of sets over the category of affine schemes. The Zariski topology in the set-theoretic sense is then replaced by a Zariski topology in the sense of Grothendieck topology. Grothendieck introduced Grothendieck topologies having in mind more exotic but geometrically finer and more sensitive examples than the crude Zariski topology, namely the étale topology, and the two flat Grothendieck topologies: fppf and fpqc. Nowadays some other examples have become prominent, including the Nisnevich topology. Sheaves can be furthermore generalized to stacks in the sense of Grothendieck, usually with some additional representability conditions, leading to Artin stacks and, even finer, Deligne–Mumford stacks, both often called algebraic stacks.

See also 

 List of commutative algebra topics
 Glossary of commutative algebra
 Combinatorial commutative algebra
 Gröbner basis
 Homological algebra

Notes

References